The Cannonball Run is a 1981 action comedy film. It was directed by Hal Needham, produced by Hong Kong's Golden Harvest films, and distributed by 20th Century Fox. Filmed in Panavision, it features an all-star ensemble cast, including Burt Reynolds, Dom DeLuise, Roger Moore, Farrah Fawcett, Jackie Chan and Dean Martin. The film is based on the 1979 running of an actual cross-country outlaw road race in the United States, beginning in Connecticut and ending in California.

It was one of 1981's most successful films at the box office. It was followed by Cannonball Run II (1984), and Speed Zone (1989). Cannonball Run and the 1984 sequel were the final film appearances of actor Dean Martin. It also featured Jackie Chan in his second Hollywood role.

Plot
Race teams have gathered in Connecticut to start a cross-country car race. One at a time, teams drive up to the starters' stand, punch a time card to indicate their time of departure, then take off.

Among the teams:
 JJ McClure, a famous racing driver and team owner, and Victor Prinzi, his chief mechanic and occasional co-driver, drive a Dodge Tradesman ambulance fitted with a NASCAR engine.
 Former F1 icon (and Scotch-swilling) Jamie Blake and his (gambling-obsessed) teammate Morris Fenderbaum, dressed as Catholic priests, drive a red Ferrari 308 GTS 1979. 
 Jill Rivers and Marcie Thatcher, two attractive women who use their looks to their advantage, start the race in a black Lamborghini Countach.
 Two drivers race in a high-tech, computer-laden Subaru GL 4WD hatchback with a rocket booster engine.
 A pair of good ol' boys, drive a street-legal replica of Donnie Allison's Hawaiian Tropic-sponsored NASCAR Winston Cup Series Chevrolet stock car owned by Hoss Ellington. 
 Seymour Goldfarb, Jr., a rich British playboy who believes himself to be Roger Moore, who drives a silver Aston Martin DB5.
 A wealthy oil-rich Middle-Eastern sheikh, driving a white Rolls-Royce Silver Shadow.

At the starting line, observing from the shadows, is Mr. Arthur J. Foyt, a representative of the "Safety Enforcement Unit", who tries to stop the race because of its environmental effects and safety issues. In the car with Foyt is a photographer and tree lover, Pamela Glover.

Beyond the starting line, JJ and Victor (driving their ambulance) come across Foyt and Glover, who have been involved in a minor accident. Glover implores JJ and Victor to help, but when they tell Foyt to enter the ambulance through the back door, they kidnap Glover and take off without Foyt.

As the race progresses, Victor occasionally turns into his alter ego, superhero "Captain Chaos". Dr. Van Helsing and his huge hypodermic needle are also in the ambulance to "help" keep Glover quiet during the race.

Various teams are shown either evading law enforcement, most of which deal with talking their way out of a possible ticket, or concocting crazy schemes to outmaneuver their opponents.
 Jill and Marcie use sex appeal as their weapon, unzipping their race suits to display copious amounts of cleavage during traffic stops. 
 In New Jersey, the ambulance is pulled over by state troopers. Dr. Van Helsing drugs Glover, and JJ and Victor are able to convince the troopers that they are rushing "the Senator's wife" to UCLA for medical treatment (offering the theory, which to JJ and Victor's happy surprise is Van Helsing's idea, that her condition prevents them from flying, or from even driving through Denver).
 The Subaru team is able to turn off their car's headlights and use infrared sensors for racing at night.
 Seymour Goldfarb is frequently shown evading police by using various James Bond-type gadgets, such as oil slicks, smoke screens, switchable license plates, all installed in his Aston Martin DB5.
 Mr. Compton and "Super Chief" Finch disguise themselves as a newlywed couple on a motorcycle, but Finch's extra weight forces the two to ride cross-country in a continuous wheelie.

The primary rivalry is between the ambulance and the Ferrari. In Ohio, Fenderbaum and Blake are able to convince Victor to stop the ambulance in order to bless the patient on board. While Blake administers the blessing, Fenderbaum flattens one of the ambulance's rear tires. JJ achieves revenge in Missouri by convincing a nearby police officer that the two men dressed as priests are actually Communists and sex perverts who are responsible for the flashing victim in the ambulance.

The leading teams find themselves stopped on a desert highway, waiting for construction workers to clear the road. A biker gang arrives and harasses Compton and Finch. It quickly escalates into a melee. "Captain Chaos" emerges to fight the bikers. The Subaru team also joins the fight. The construction crew announces that the road is open, so the teams sprint back to their cars to resume the race.

The ambulance falls behind the pack until Victor once again becomes Captain Chaos. The vehicles all arrive at the final destination at the same time, resulting in a foot race to the finish line. JJ hands his team's time card to Victor, then ambushes the remaining racers, leaving only Victor and one of the Lamborghini women, Marcie. Just when it appears Victor will reach the time clock first, a spectator shouts that her "baby" has fallen into the water. Victor, still in his Captain Chaos persona, rushes to save the baby (later revealed to be the spectator's dog), allowing Marcie to clock in first and win the race.

JJ is furious and never wants to see Captain Chaos again, but Victor replies that he does not care, becoming the persona he really wants to be, Captain USA. JJ laughs and hugs him. Foyt reappears and blames everyone for ruining the American highway. Seymour offers a cigar and tells Foyt to use the lighter in his car, which activates an ejection seat when pushed. Nothing happens at first, but when Seymour presses the button, he (Seymour) goes flying into the water.

Cast
Cannonball Run featured an all-star ensemble cast, including these actors:
 Burt Reynolds and Dom DeLuise as racer J.J. McClure and his buddy, Victor Prinzim who occasionally "becomes" his alter ego "Captain Chaos", to the annoyance of J.J.
 Roger Moore as Seymour Goldfarb, Jr., a self-parody of his role as James Bond. His car, an Aston Martin DB5, displays the UK registration plate 6633 PP, although Moore's Bond never actually drove an Aston Martin in any of his seven Bond appearances. The original UK registration plate was BMT 216A before being sold to businessman Gavin Keyzar. Molly Picon portrays his mother. Several women ride with Seymour, including model Lois Hamilton, billed as Lois Areno.
 Farrah Fawcett as tree-loving photographer Pamela Glover. J.J. calls her "Beauty".
 Dean Martin and Sammy Davis Jr. as race car driver Jamie Blake and scam artist Morris Fenderbaum, disguised as Catholic priests. Jimmy "The Greek" Snyder plays himself as Fenderbaum bets on his success (Snyder was Dean Martin's neighbor when both were growing up in Steubenville, Ohio). Blake's car, a Ferrari 308 GTS 1979, is the same as the model in the TV series TV Magnum, P.I.
 George Furth as Arthur J. Foyt, the insipid, uptight main antagonist of the film, who tries to have the race stopped.
 Jackie Chan and Michael Hui as drivers of a Subaru GL filled with gadgets. In the opening part of the film, Chan and Hui are introduced on a talk show (hosted by Johnny Yune) as the operators of Japan's entry into the race. Both Chan and Hui are actually Chinese. 
 Jamie Farr as Sheik Abdul ben Falafel, a wealthy Arabian potentate determined to win the race, even if he has to buy it. Bianca Jagger makes a brief appearance as his sister. Farr's car is a Rolls-Royce Silver Shadow. The Sheik is the only character to appear in all three Cannonball Run films.
 Mel Tillis and Terry Bradshaw are Mel and Terry, a couple of "good ol' boys" driving a 1976 Chevrolet Chevelle Laguna NASCAR Hawaiian Tropic replica, then, at the start of the race they have a Monte Carlo.
 Adrienne Barbeau and Tara Buckman as Marcie Thatcher and Jill Rivers, satin-Spandex-clad "hotties" in a black Lamborghini Countach. The same Lamborghini was used in the film's opening credits as it was being pursued by a Nevada Highway Patrol car. Their character names are not mentioned during the story but appear in the end credits. Their names return in the sequel, though the parts were re-cast. 
 Valerie Perrine has a cameo as a state trooper. 
 Peter Fonda has a cameo role referencing his character in The Wild Angels. The appearance of Fonda and his motorcycle gang during a halt in the race offered an excuse for Chan to demonstrate his martial arts skills during the fight sequence. Fonda's big, bald biker buddy is played by Robert Tessier.
 Bert Convy as wealthy but bored executive Bradford Compton, who planned to run the Cannonball by motorcycle with the help of an old friend, Shakey Finch (Warren Berlinger), once the world's greatest cross-country motorcyclist. The two planned to disguise themselves as newlyweds. Compton's now portly ally forced them into a wheelie for the entire race.
 Jack Elam as Doctor Nikolas Van Helsing, same name as the famous vampire hunter. This Van Helsing is a proctologist and graduate of the University of Rangoon, and the Knoxville, Tennessee College of Faith Healing.
 Rick Aviles and Alfie Wise as Mad Dog and Batman, tow truck drivers who jump the train flatcar.
 John Fiedler as the desk clerk.
 Joe Kłecko as the Polish driver in the van who gets pulled over by Mr. Foyt (Kłecko was a player in the National Football League).
 Car and Driver Magazine columnist and correspondent Brock Yates, who having created the real-life Cannonball Run, wrote the film directly for the screen, plays the race organizer of who lays down the rules at the starting line.
 Director Hal Needham appears uncredited as the ambulance EMT.
 Veteran Daytona 500 commentator Ken Squier appears as a California Highway Patrolman.
 Veteran voice actor June Foray provided the dubbed dialogue of several of the women who escort Goldfarb in the race ("Seymour's girls", as the opening credits list them) in an uncredited performance.

Production
The film continued director Hal Needham's tradition of showing a gag reel of bloopers during the closing credits (a practice he started with Smokey and the Bandit II). Jackie Chan says this inspired him to do the same at the end of most of his films.

Original race
The film is based on the 1979 running of the Cannonball Baker Sea-To-Shining-Sea Memorial Trophy Dash, an actual cross-country outlaw road race held four times in the 1970s, starting at the Red Ball Garage on 31st Street in New York City (later the Lock, Stock and Barrel Restaurant in Darien, Connecticut) and ending at the Portofino Inn in Redondo Beach, California, in Los Angeles.

The screenwriter was automotive journalist Brock Yates, who had conceived the real-life Cannonball Baker event. Yates had originally proposed the race as a writer for Car and Driver. The race had only one rule: "All competitors will drive any vehicle of their choosing, over any route, at any speed they judge practical, between the starting point and destination. The competitor finishing with the lowest elapsed time is the winner".

Yates' team was the only participant in the original 1971 running, which was named after the driver Ernest "Cannonball" Baker, who drove across country in 1927 and made it in 60 hours. Yates wrote a book about it called The Sunday Driver. In 1973 it was reported John G. Avildsen and writer Eugene Price was to make a film based on the book called The Cannonball-Baker-Sea-to-Shining-Sea Memorial Trophy Dash. The film was not made but the race did inspire the (unrelated) 1976 films Cannonball and The Gumball Rally.

1979 race
In the March 1979 race Yates formed one of 46 teams with director Hal Needham to compete with a 150-MPH van converted into an ambulance, with LA doctor Lyell Royer, and Brock's second wife, Pamela Reynolds, riding as the patient on the gurney. Although the ambulance never made it to the finish line — the transmission gave out 50 miles short of the Redondo Beach finish line — Yates made it to the movie as a race official and Needham as an EMT, as did the ambulance itself and even the transmission failure. The ambulance was stopped once, in Pennsylvania; that event made it into the movie, as did a cop stopping traffic in Kansas, exiting from a rodeo, to let the ambulance pass unimpeded.

The Right Bra team was put together by rail-thin auto writer Judy Stropus, race driver Donna Mae Mims and Peggy Niemcek, whose husband was part of another entry, driving a Cadillac limo. In the movie, it became a two-woman team led by buxom Adrienne Barbeau driving a Lamborghini, but as auto writer Stropus said decades later, "a little editorial license never hurt anyone". Yates points out in his book Cannonball! that Stropus's version of the race does not mention the baptism with green fluid from the porta-potty the three girls experienced when the limo overturned.

Script
The characters J.J. and Victor participate in the Cannonball Run in an ambulance: a heavily modified Dodge van. In the beginning, J.J. says to himself "we could get a black Trans Am", then answers his own question with "Nah that's been done", a reference to the Smokey and the Bandit films of Burt Reynolds and director Hal Needham.

In an attempt to appear legitimate to law enforcement, the team of J.J. and Victor hires Doctor Nikolas Van Helsing, a frightening, yet friendly, physician of questionable skill played by Jack Elam. They kidnap attractive young photographer Pamela Glover (Farrah Fawcett) — whom they nickname "Beauty" — to be their cover patient. Beauty vehemently opposes her kidnapping first, but eventually comes to sympathize with her captors and falls for J.J.

Development
Yates and Needham worked on a script and Al Ruddy became attached as producer. They wanted Reynolds to star, but he was reluctant to make more car-themed films. He was eventually persuaded by Needham's promise to keep the actor's schedule to only 14 days of filming, and a fee of $5 million plus a percentage of the profits. Finance came from Raymond Chow of Golden Harvest, who requested that Jackie Chan be included in the cast.

Reynolds later said: "I did that film for all the wrong reasons. I never liked it. I did it to help out a friend of mine, Hal Needham. And I also felt it was immoral to turn down that kind of money. I suppose I sold out so I couldn't really object to what people wrote about me".

Reception

Box office
A huge commercial success, The Cannonball Run opened June 19, 1981 on 1,673 screens and grossed $11,765,574 in its opening weekend, the fourth highest opening of all time, but this was not enough to beat Superman II that opened the same weekend with a record-breaking $14,100,523. The film went on to gross $72,179,579 in the United States and Canada, making it the sixth highest-grossing film of 1981, behind Raiders of the Lost Ark, On Golden Pond, Superman II, Arthur, and Stripes.

It was also successful overseas. In France, The Cannonball Run sold 988,509 box office admissions in 1981. In Germany, the film sold 4,825,937 admissions, becoming the third highest-grossing film of 1981. In Japan, it was the second highest-grossing foreign film of 1982, grossing  at the box office.

Critical response
Despite its box office success, most critics reviewed the film negatively. It has received an approval rating of 29% on Review aggregation website Rotten Tomatoes based on 34 reviews. The critical consensus reads: "Cannonball Run casts a bevy of famous faces as its wacky racers but forgets to give them characters to play, resulting in 90 dull minutes that feel like a marathon". Roger Ebert gave the film a half-star out of four, calling it "an abdication of artistic responsibility at the lowest possible level of ambition. In other words, they didn't even care enough to make a good lousy movie". Variety described the film as "full of terribly inside showbiz jokes and populated by what could be called Burt and Hal's Rat Pack, film takes place in that redneck never-never land where most of the guys are beer-guzzling good ole boys and all the gals are fabulously built tootsies".
Vincent Canby of The New York Times called the film "inoffensive and sometimes funny. Because there are only a limited number of variations that can be worked out on this same old highway race, don't bother to see it unless you're already hooked on the genre".

Accolades
The film was nominated for a Razzie Award for Worst Supporting Actress for Fawcett, but lost to Diana Scarwid for the cult film Mommie Dearest.

Accident
On June 25, 1980, 24-year-old German American stuntwoman Heidi von Beltz, a former championship skier, stuntwoman, and aspiring actress, was critically injured in a car crash during production of the film. The original stunt person had left the production to attend an emergency family illness, and the stunt coordinator Bobby Bass called his then-fiancée von Beltz to the set for a stunt that he said was to be "a piece of cake". The car was to be driven by stuntman Jimmy Nickerson, and required him to weave between oncoming vehicles. Meanwhile, von Beltz was asked to ride in the passenger seat, operating a smoke machine, giving the impression the car was on fire.

The car, an Aston Martin, had been beset with mechanical problems, including defective steering, clutch, and speedometer. It also had bald tyres and no seat belts. Nickerson asked for repairs to the car, and while some were done, other things were left unfixed, including the lack of seatbelts. During the planned stunt the car collided head-on with a van, breaking von Beltz's neck and leaving her quadriplegic.

When it became clear that von Beltz's personal injury lawsuit would exceed all available primary insurance coverage, the production's excess insurer, Interstate Fire (a subsidiary of Hollywood's favorite insurer, Fireman's Fund Insurance Company) sued von Beltz and her employer, Stuntman Inc., for a declaratory judgment that von Beltz's lawsuit was not covered under its policy. In 1988, the U.S. Court of Appeals for the Ninth Circuit ruled that there was a duty to defend, and that there was also a duty to indemnify to the extent that von Beltz was seeking recovery for mental injuries (the exclusion for bodily injuries was ruled to be enforceable).

She was eventually awarded $7 million although a judge reduced the amount and she ended up with $3.2 million. Much of the settlement went to her attorneys and to paying off medical bills. Her lawsuit against the movie's producers led to required seat-belt use in all stunt cars and caused the Directors Guild to prohibit directors from altering stunts on location.

Legacy
The film was followed by the sequels Cannonball Run II (1984) and Speed Zone (1989). The Cannonball Run and Cannonball Run II were the final film appearances of actor Dean Martin. The film also featured Jackie Chan in his second Hollywood role, after The Big Brawl (1980).

Sega AM2 game designer Yu Suzuki cited The Cannonball Run as an influence on his hit 1986 arcade racing game Out Run.

Remake
Warner Bros. has acquired the rights to the Cannonball Run franchise and in 2016 set Etan Cohen to write and direct a remake as Cannonball. Andre Morgan and Alan Gasmer were hired as producers.

Doug Liman was in early talks to direct the film from a script by Thomas Lennon and Robert Ben Garant in June 2018.

See also

 Cannonball (film) - Comedy drama also based on the Cannonball Run
 Cannonball Run II
 List of American films of 1981
 Speed Zone, also known as Cannonball Run III
 List of video games
 Need for Speed: The Run

References

External links

 
 
 
 
 
 
  Cannonball Run Pit Stop: A tribute website to "The Cannonball Run", "Smokey and the Bandit" and other collaborations between Burt Reynolds and Hal Needham, which includes several interviews and information on the movies.
 Magazine articles by Gero Hoschek, Eoin Young and others about the actual 1979 race which was referenced in the movie
 The Transcon Medivac Ambulance featured in the movie
 2011 NPR interview with Hal Needham conducted on "Wait Wait... Don't Tell Me!" news trivia program
 Cannonball!: World's Greatest Outlaw Road Race, by Brock Yates

1981 comedy films
1981 films
1980s action comedy films
1980s comedy road movies
20th Century Fox films
American action comedy films
American auto racing films
American comedy road movies
1980s English-language films
Films directed by Hal Needham
Films set in Connecticut
Films shot in California
Films shot in Georgia (U.S. state)
Films shot in Nevada
Golden Harvest films
Hong Kong action comedy films
1980s American films
1980s Hong Kong films